"The Drugs Don't Work" is a song by English rock band the Verve. The song was written by Richard Ashcroft and is featured on their third studio album, Urban Hymns (1997). It was released on 1 September 1997 as the second single from the album, debuting at number one on the UK Singles Chart. The beginning of the video shows the band walking down the street, following on from the end of "Bitter Sweet Symphony".

Ranked number seven on Channel 4's list of the "100 Greatest #1 Singles", the sombre nature of the song unintentionally captured the spirit of the nation as it was released the day after Princess Diana died. In October 2011, NME placed "The Drugs Don't Work" at number 78 on its list "150 Best Tracks of the Past 15 Years".

Background and recording
Lead singer Richard Ashcroft wrote the song in early 1995. He briefly mentioned it in an interview at the time, relating it to his drug usage: "There's a new track I've just written ... It goes 'the drugs don't work, they just make me worse, and I know I'll see your face again'. That's how I'm feeling at the moment. They make me worse, man. But I still take 'em. Out of boredom and frustration you turn to something else to escape."

Ashcroft also performed the song when the band was touring in support of A Northern Soul. The song was eventually recorded for Urban Hymns. The album's producer, Chris Potter later referred to it as both the best song and best vocal he had ever recorded.

Critical reception
Alan Jones from Music Week wrote, "Beautifully orchestrated, semi-acoustic and distinctly old-fashioned, it's a melancholy ballad executed with great panache and enormous style by a group who can only get bigger." Jon Wiederhorn from Rolling Stone described the song as "a tear-stained ballad enhanced with sparse, nebulous horns and reverberating pedal steel guitar."

Music video
The accompanying music video for the song was directed by Andy Baybutt. The video begins with several references to the Verve's earlier work. The band appears in the same formation and clothes as they did at the end of the video for "Bitter Sweet Symphony". The cover of the machine on the front of the album No Come Down also appears briefly. The band turns around a corner and walks over to a vending machine called "Feelings". This refers to the song "Life's an Ocean" from their second album, A Northern Soul, where Ashcroft sings, "I was buying some feelings from a vending machine" (the same vending machine is also seen on the back of that album). The rest of the video shows, partially in black and white, the band playing the song indoors. The video ends with a piece of burning wood, with the words 'Urban Hymns' written on it, floating on water. The original concept for the video was to have the band filmed in a maze to illustrate "loss of direction".

Track listings

 UK CD1 and cassette single 
 "The Drugs Don't Work" (radio edit)
 "Three Steps"
 "The Drugs Don't Work" (original demo)

 UK CD2 
 "The Drugs Don't Work" (full length)
 "Bitter Sweet Symphony" (James Lavelle Remix)
 "The Crab"
 "Stamped"

 UK 7-inch jukebox single 
A. "The Drugs Don't Work" (radio edit) – 4:45
B. "The Drugs Don't Work" (original demo) – 4:44

 UK and European 12-inch single 
A1. "The Drugs Don't Work" (radio edit)
A2. "Three Steps"
B1. "The Drugs Don't Work" (demo)
B2. "The Crab"

 Australian limited-edition CD single 
 "The Drugs Don't Work" (radio edit)
 "Three Steps"
 "The Drugs Don't Work" (original demo)
 "Bitter Sweet Symphony" (original)

Charts and certifications

Weekly charts

Year-end charts

Certifications

References

The Verve songs
1997 singles
1997 songs
Hut Records singles
Number-one singles in Scotland
Song recordings produced by Chris Potter (record producer)
Songs about drugs
Songs written by Richard Ashcroft
UK Singles Chart number-one singles